Elin Karin Klinga (born 13 August 1969) is a Swedish actress who took part in several of Ingmar Bergman's late stage productions. As a student Klinga attended the Adolf Fredrik's Music School in Stockholm. One of Bergman's favourite actresses, she starred in productions including The Image Makers (1998), The Ghost Sonata (2000) and Ghosts (2003).

References

External links

Swedish actresses
Living people
1969 births
Ek family